Gubhana is a village in Badli Tehsil in Jhajjar District of Haryana State, India. Its Pin code is 124501 and postal head office is Bahadurgarh.

Nearby villages
 Lukshar (3 km)
 Shah Pur (5 km)
 Badli (5 km)
 Kheri Jatt (6 km)
 Lagarpur (7 km)
 Mayna
 Karotha

References 

Villages in Jhajjar district